Lieutenant General Babar Iftikhar  is a three-star rank general in the Pakistani Army. He was the former 21st director general of the Inter-Services Public Relations (ISPR) from 16 January 2020 to 6 December 2022. He was commissioned in the Pakistan Army in 1990. He is the current commander of V Corps of the Pakistan Army which has its headquarters in Karachi.

Education
Babar Iftikhar attended the Army Burn Hall College in Abbottabad. He graduated from the Command and Staff College and later attended the Royal Jordanian Command & Staff College. After earning his initial degrees, he attended the National Defence University.

Military career
Iftikhar was commissioned in the 6th Lancers (Watson's Horse) in March 1990. He carries with him a rich command, staff and instructional experience. He served as Brigade Major at an armoured brigade, Brigadier Staff at an infantry division in North Waziristan (OAM) during Operation Zarb-e-Azb and as Chief of Staff at Corps headquarters. He was faculty of the Pakistan Military Academy and National Defense University, Islamabad. In October 2022, he was promoted to the rank of lieutenant general.

Effective dates of promotion

References

External links
Major General Babar Iftikhar at Inter-Services Public Relations

Living people
Pakistani generals
Directors-General of the Inter-Services Public Relations
Year of birth missing (living people)
Army Burn Hall College alumni
Pakistan Command and Staff College alumni